The Fresnel equations (or Fresnel coefficients) describe the reflection and transmission of light (or electromagnetic radiation in general) when incident on an interface between different optical media. They were deduced by Augustin-Jean Fresnel who was the first to understand that light is a transverse wave, even though no one realized that the "vibrations" of the wave were electric and magnetic fields. For the first time, polarization could be understood quantitatively, as Fresnel's equations correctly predicted the differing behaviour of waves of the s and p polarizations incident upon a material interface.

Overview
When light strikes the interface between a medium with refractive index n1 and a second medium with refractive index n2, both reflection and refraction of the light may occur. The Fresnel equations give the ratio of the reflected wave's electric field to the incident wave's electric field, and the ratio of the transmitted wave's electric field to the incident wave's electric field, for each of two components of polarization. (The magnetic fields can also be related using similar coefficients.) These ratios are generally complex, describing not only the relative amplitudes but also the phase shifts at the interface.

The equations assume the interface between the media is flat and that the media are homogeneous and isotropic. The incident light is assumed to be a plane wave, which is sufficient to solve any problem since any incident light field can be decomposed into plane waves and polarizations.

S and P polarizations

There are two sets of Fresnel coefficients for two different linear polarization  components of the incident wave. Since any polarization state can be resolved into a combination of two orthogonal linear polarizations, this is sufficient for any problem. Likewise, unpolarized (or "randomly polarized") light has an equal amount of power in each of two linear polarizations.

The s polarization refers to polarization of a wave's electric field normal to the plane of incidence (the  direction in the derivation below); then the magnetic field is in the plane of incidence. The p polarization refers to polarization of the electric field in the plane of incidence (the  plane in the derivation below); then the magnetic field is normal to the plane of incidence.

Although the reflection and transmission are dependent on polarization,  at normal incidence (θ = 0) there is no distinction between them so all polarization states are governed by a single set of Fresnel coefficients (and another special case is mentioned below in which that is true).

Power (intensity) reflection and transmission coefficients

In the diagram on the right, an incident plane wave in the direction of the ray IO strikes the interface between two media of refractive indices n1 and n2 at point O. Part of the wave is reflected in the direction  OR, and part refracted in the direction OT. The angles that the incident, reflected and refracted rays make to the normal of the interface are given as θi, θr and θt, respectively.

The relationship between these angles is given by the law of reflection:

and Snell's law:

The behavior of light striking the interface is solved by considering the electric and magnetic fields that constitute an electromagnetic wave, and the laws of electromagnetism, as shown below. The ratio of waves' electric field (or magnetic field) amplitudes are obtained, but in practice one is more often interested in formulae which determine power coefficients, since power (or irradiance) is what can be directly measured at optical frequencies. The power of a wave is generally proportional to the square of the electric (or magnetic) field amplitude.

We call the fraction of the incident power that is reflected from the interface the reflectance (or reflectivity, or power reflection coefficient) R, and the fraction that is refracted into the second medium is called the transmittance (or transmissivity, or power transmission coefficient) T. Note that these are what would be measured right at each side of an interface and do not account for attenuation of a wave in an absorbing medium following transmission or reflection.

The reflectance for s-polarized light is

while the reflectance for p-polarized light is

We assume that the media are non-magnetic (i.e., μ1 = μ2 = μ0), which is typically a good approximation at optical frequencies (and for transparent media at other frequencies). Then the wave impedances are determined solely by the refractive indices n1 and n2:

where  is the impedance of free space and =1,2. Making this substitution, we obtain equations using the refractive indices:

The second form of each equation is derived from the first by eliminating θt using Snell's law and trigonometric identities.

As a consequence of conservation of energy, one can find the transmitted power (or more correctly, irradiance: power per unit area) simply as the portion of the incident power that isn't reflected:

and

Note that all such intensities are measured in terms of a wave's irradiance in the direction normal to the interface; this is also what is measured in typical experiments. That number could be obtained from irradiances in the direction of an incident or reflected wave (given by the magnitude of a wave's Poynting vector) multiplied by cosθ for a wave at an angle θ to the normal direction (or equivalently, taking the dot product of the Poynting vector with the unit vector normal to the interface). This complication can be ignored in the case of the reflection coefficient, since cosθi = cosθr, so that the ratio of reflected to incident irradiance in the wave's direction is the same as in the direction normal to the interface.

Although these relationships describe the basic physics, in many practical applications one is concerned with "natural light" that can be described as unpolarized. That means that there is an equal amount of power in the s and p polarizations, so that the effective reflectivity of the material is just the average of the two reflectivities:

For low-precision applications involving unpolarized light, such as computer graphics, rather than rigorously computing the effective reflection coefficient for each angle, Schlick's approximation is often used.

Special cases

Normal incidence
For the case of normal incidence,  and there is no distinction between s and p polarization.  Thus, the reflectance simplifies to

For common glass (n2 ≈ 1.5) surrounded by air (n1=1), the power reflectance at normal incidence can be seen to be about 4%, or 8% accounting for both sides of a glass pane.

Brewster's angle

This angle is known as Brewster's angle, and is around 56° for n1=1 and n2=1.5 (typical glass).

Total internal reflection

This phenomenon, known as total internal reflection, occurs at incidence angles for which Snell's law predicts that the sine of the angle of refraction would exceed unity (whereas in fact sinθ ≤ 1 for all real θ). For glass with n=1.5 surrounded by air, the critical angle is approximately 42°.

Complex amplitude reflection and transmission coefficients
The above equations relating powers (which could be measured with a photometer for instance) are derived from the Fresnel equations which solve the physical problem in terms of electromagnetic field complex amplitudes, i.e., considering phase shifts in addition to their amplitudes. Those underlying equations supply generally complex-valued ratios of those EM fields and may take several different forms, depending on the formalism used. The complex amplitude coefficients for reflection and transmission are usually represented by lower case r and t (whereas the power coefficients are capitalized). As before, we are assuming the magnetic permeability,  of both media to be equal to the permeability of free space  as is essentially true of all dielectrics at optical frequencies. 

In the following equations and graphs, we adopt the following conventions. For s polarization, the reflection coefficient  is defined as the ratio of the reflected wave's complex electric field amplitude to that of the incident wave, whereas for p polarization  is the ratio of the waves complex magnetic field amplitudes (or equivalently, the negative of the ratio of their electric field amplitudes). The transmission coefficient  is the ratio of the transmitted wave's complex electric field amplitude to that of the incident wave, for either polarization.

The equations consider a plane wave incident on a plane interface at angle of incidence  a wave reflected at angle  and a wave transmitted at angle  In the case of an interface into an absorbing material (where n is complex) or total internal reflection, the angle of transmission does not generally evaluate to a real number. In that case, however, meaningful results can be obtained using formulations of these relationships in which trigonometric functions and geometric angles are avoided; the inhomogeneous waves launched into the second medium cannot be described using a single propagation angle. 

Using this convention,

One can write very similar equations applying to the ratio of the waves' magnetic fields, but comparison of the electric fields is more conventional.

Because the reflected and incident waves propagate in the same medium and make the same angle with the normal to the surface, the power reflection coefficient R is just the squared magnitude of r:

On the other hand, calculation of the power transmission coefficient  is less straightforward, since the light travels in different directions in the two media. What's more, the wave impedances in the two media differ; power (irradiance) is given by the square of the electric field amplitude divided by the characteristic impedance of the medium (or by the square of the magnetic field multiplied by the characteristic impedance). This results in:

The  factors adjust the waves' powers so they are reckoned in the direction normal to the interface, for both the incident and transmitted waves, so that full power transmission corresponds to T=1.

In the case of total internal reflection where the power transmission  is zero,  nevertheless describes the electric field (including its phase) just beyond the interface. This is an evanescent field which does not propagate as a wave (thus =0) but has nonzero values very close to the interface. These phase shifts are different for  s and p waves, which is the well-known principle by which total internal reflection is used to effect polarization transformations.

Alternative forms

These formulas are known respectively as Fresnel's sine law and Fresnel's tangent law.

Multiple surfaces
When light makes multiple reflections between two or more parallel surfaces, the multiple beams of light generally interfere with one another, resulting in net transmission and reflection amplitudes that depend on the light's wavelength. The interference, however, is seen only when the surfaces are at distances comparable to or smaller than the light's coherence length, which for ordinary white light is few micrometers; it can be much larger for light from a laser.

An example of interference between reflections is the iridescent colours seen in a soap bubble or in thin oil films on water. Applications include Fabry–Pérot interferometers, antireflection coatings, and optical filters. A quantitative analysis of these effects is based on the Fresnel equations, but with additional calculations to account for interference.

The transfer-matrix method, or the recursive Rouard method can be used to solve multiple-surface problems.

History

In 1808, Étienne-Louis Malus discovered that when a ray of light was reflected off a non-metallic surface at the appropriate angle, it behaved like one of the two rays emerging from a doubly-refractive calcite crystal. He later coined the term polarization to describe this behavior.  In 1815, the dependence of the polarizing angle on the refractive index was determined experimentally by David Brewster. But the reason for that dependence was such a deep mystery that in late 1817, Thomas Young was moved to write:

In 1821, however, Augustin-Jean Fresnel derived results equivalent to his sine and tangent laws (above), by modeling light waves as transverse elastic waves with vibrations perpendicular to what had previously been called the plane of polarization. Fresnel promptly confirmed by experiment that the equations correctly predicted the direction of polarization of the reflected beam when the incident beam was polarized at 45° to the plane of incidence, for light incident from air onto glass or water; in particular, the equations gave the correct polarization at Brewster's angle. The experimental confirmation was reported in a "postscript" to the work in which Fresnel first revealed his theory that light waves, including "unpolarized" waves, were purely transverse.

Details of Fresnel's derivation, including the modern forms of the sine law and tangent law, were given later, in a memoir read to the French Academy of Sciences in January 1823. That derivation combined conservation of energy with continuity of the tangential vibration at the interface, but failed to allow for any condition on the normal component of vibration. The first derivation from electromagnetic principles was given by Hendrik Lorentz in 1875.

In the same memoir of January 1823, Fresnel found that for angles of incidence greater than the critical angle, his formulas for the reflection coefficients ( and ) gave complex values with unit magnitudes. Noting that the magnitude, as usual, represented the ratio of peak amplitudes, he guessed that the argument represented the phase shift, and verified the hypothesis experimentally. The verification involved
 calculating the angle of incidence that would introduce a total phase difference of 90° between the s and p components, for various numbers of total internal reflections at that angle (generally there were two solutions),
 subjecting light to that number of total internal reflections at that angle of incidence, with an initial linear polarization at 45° to the plane of incidence, and
 checking that the final polarization was circular.
Thus he finally had a quantitative theory for what we now call the Fresnel rhomb — a device that he had been using in experiments, in one form or another, since 1817 (see Fresnel rhomb §History).

The success of the complex reflection coefficient inspired James MacCullagh and Augustin-Louis Cauchy, beginning in 1836, to analyze reflection from metals by using the Fresnel equations with a complex refractive index.

Four weeks before he presented his completed theory of total internal reflection and the rhomb, Fresnel submitted a memoir in which he introduced the needed terms linear polarization, circular polarization, and elliptical polarization, and in which he explained optical rotation as a species of birefringence: linearly-polarized light can be resolved into two circularly-polarized components rotating in opposite directions, and if these propagate at different speeds, the phase difference between them — hence the orientation of their linearly-polarized resultant — will vary continuously with distance.

Thus Fresnel's interpretation of the complex values of his reflection coefficients marked the confluence of several streams of his research and, arguably, the essential completion of his reconstruction of physical optics on the transverse-wave hypothesis (see Augustin-Jean Fresnel).

Derivation 

Here we systematically derive the above relations from electromagnetic premises.

Material parameters 

In order to compute meaningful Fresnel coefficients, we must assume that the medium is (approximately) linear and homogeneous. If the medium is also isotropic, the four field vectors  are related by

where ϵ and μ are scalars, known respectively as the (electric) permittivity and the (magnetic) permeability of the medium. For a vacuum, these have the values ϵ0 and μ0, respectively. Hence we define the relative permittivity (or dielectric constant) , and the relative permeability .

In optics it is common to assume that the medium is non-magnetic, so that μrel=1. For ferromagnetic materials at radio/microwave frequencies, larger values of μrel must be taken into account. But, for optically transparent media, and for all other materials at optical frequencies (except possible metamaterials), μrel is indeed very close to 1; that is, μ≈μ0.

In optics, one usually knows the refractive index n of the medium, which is the ratio of the speed of light in a vacuum to the speed of light in the medium. The last-mentioned relation, however, will make it convenient to derive the reflection coefficients in terms of the wave admittance , which is the reciprocal of the wave impedance .

In the case of uniform plane sinusoidal waves, the wave impedance or admittance is known as the intrinsic impedance or admittance of the medium. This case is the one for which the Fresnel coefficients are to be derived.

Electromagnetic plane waves 

In a uniform plane sinusoidal electromagnetic wave, the electric field  has the form

So a phase advance is equivalent to multiplication by a complex constant with a negative argument. This becomes more obvious when the field is factored as  where the last factor contains the time-dependence.

This in turn is equal to  Solving for  gives

As usual, we drop the time-dependent factor  which is understood to multiply every complex field quantity. The electric field for a uniform plane sine wave will then be represented by the location-dependent phasor

For fields of that form, Faraday's law and the Maxwell-Ampère law respectively reduce to

If the material parameters ϵ and μ are real (as in a lossless dielectric), these equations show that  form a right-handed orthogonal triad, so that the same equations apply to the magnitudes of the respective vectors.

Multiplying the last two equations gives

Dividing (or cross-multiplying) the same two equations gives  where

This is the intrinsic admittance.

From we obtain the phase velocity  For a vacuum this reduces to  Dividing the second result by the first gives

For a non-magnetic medium (the usual case), this becomes 

By division,  For a non-magnetic medium, this becomes

The wave vectors 

In Cartesian coordinates , let the region  have refractive index  intrinsic admittance  etc., and let the region  have refractive index  intrinsic admittance  etc. Then the  plane is the interface, and the  axis is normal to the interface (see diagram). Let the plane of incidence be the  plane (the plane of the page), with the angle of incidence  measured from  towards . Let the angle of refraction, measured in the same sense, be  where the subscript  stands for transmitted (reserving   for reflected).

In the absence of Doppler shifts, ω does not change on reflection or refraction.

So, for a given ω, if we redefine  as the magnitude of the wave vector in the reference medium (for which ), then the wave vector has magnitude  in the first medium (region  in the diagram) and magnitude  in the second medium. From the magnitudes and the geometry, we find that the wave vectors are

where the last step uses Snell's law. The corresponding dot products in the phasor form are

Hence:

The s components 

For the s polarization, the  field is parallel to the  axis and may therefore be described by its component in the  direction. Let the reflection and transmission coefficients be  and  respectively. Then, if the incident  field is taken to have unit amplitude, the phasor form of its  component is

and the reflected and transmitted fields, in the same form, are

Under the sign convention used in this article, a positive reflection or transmission coefficient is one that preserves the direction of the transverse field, meaning (in this context) the field normal to the plane of incidence. For the s polarization, that means the  field. If the incident, reflected, and transmitted  fields (in the above equations) are in the  direction ("out of the page"), then the respective  fields are in the directions of the red arrows, since  form a right-handed orthogonal triad.

and

At normal incidence  indicated by an additional subscript 0, these results become

and

The p components 

For the p polarization, the incident, reflected, and transmitted  fields are parallel to the red arrows and may therefore be described by their components in the directions of those arrows. Let those components be  (redefining the symbols for the new context). Then, if the incident  field is taken to have unit amplitude, we have

This is consistent with the adopted sign convention, namely that a positive reflection or transmission coefficient is one that preserves the direction of the transverse field the  field in the case of the p polarization. The agreement of the other field with the red arrows reveals an alternative definition of the sign convention: that a positive reflection or transmission coefficient is one for which the field vector in the plane of incidence points towards the same medium before and after reflection or transmission.

So, for the incident, reflected, and transmitted  fields, let the respective components in the  direction be .  Then, since 

and

At normal incidence  indicated by an additional subscript 0, these results become

and

While this clash of signs is a disadvantage of the convention, the attendant advantage is that the signs agree at grazing incidence.

Power ratios (reflectivity and transmissivity) 

The Poynting vector for a wave is a vector whose component in any direction is the irradiance (power per unit area) of that wave on a surface perpendicular to that direction.

for the s polarization, and

for the p polarization. Note that when comparing the powers of two such waves in the same medium and with the same cosθ, the impedance and geometric factors mentioned above are identical and cancel out. But in computing the power transmission (below), these factors must be taken into account.

The simplest way to obtain the power transmission coefficient (transmissivity, the ratio of transmitted power to incident power in the direction normal to the interface, i.e. the  direction) is to use  (conservation of energy). In this way we find

for the s polarization, and

for the p polarization.

But, for given amplitude (as noted above), the component of the Poynting vector in the  direction is proportional to the geometric factor  and inversely proportional to the wave impedance . Applying these corrections to each wave, we obtain two ratios multiplying the square of the amplitude transmission coefficient:

for the s polarization, and

for the p polarization. The last two equations apply only to lossless dielectrics, and only at incidence angles smaller than the critical angle (beyond which, of course).

For unpolarized light:

Where .

Equal refractive indices 

When extended to spherical reflection or scattering, this results in the Kerker effect for Mie scattering.

Non-magnetic media 

Since the Fresnel equations were developed for optics, they are usually given for non-magnetic materials. Dividing by ) yields

For non-magnetic media we can substitute the vacuum permeability μ0 for μ, so that

that is, the admittances are simply proportional to the corresponding refractive indices. For the amplitude coefficients we obtain:

For the case of normal incidence these reduce to:

The power reflection coefficients become:

Brewster's angle 

Hence  and only the s-polarized component is reflected. This is what happens at the Brewster angle.

for Brewster's angle.

Equal permittivities 

Although it is not encountered in practice, the equations can also apply to the case of two media with a common permittivity but different refractive indices due to different permeabilities. Similarly, Fresnel's sine law will apply to the p polarization instead of the s polarization, and his tangent law to the s polarization instead of the p polarization.

This switch of polarizations has an analog in the old mechanical theory of light waves (see §History, above). One could predict reflection coefficients that agreed with observation by supposing (like Fresnel) that different refractive indices were due to different densities and that the vibrations were normal to what was then called the plane of polarization, or by supposing (like MacCullagh and Neumann) that different refractive indices were due to different elasticities and that the vibrations were parallel to that plane. Thus the condition of equal permittivities and unequal permeabilities, although not realistic, is of some historical interest.

See also
Jones calculus
Polarization mixing
Index-matching material
Field and power quantities
Fresnel rhomb, Fresnel's apparatus to produce circularly polarised light
Reflection loss
Specular reflection
Schlick's approximation
Snell's window
X-ray reflectivity
Plane of incidence
Reflections of signals on conducting lines

Notes

References

Sources
 M. Born and E. Wolf, 1970, Principles of Optics, 4th Ed., Oxford: Pergamon Press.
 J.Z. Buchwald, 1989, The Rise of the Wave Theory of Light: Optical Theory and Experiment in the Early Nineteenth Century, University of Chicago Press, .
 R.E. Collin, 1966, Foundations for Microwave Engineering, Tokyo: McGraw-Hill.
 O. Darrigol, 2012, A History of Optics: From Greek Antiquity to the Nineteenth Century, Oxford, .
 A. Fresnel, 1866 (ed. H. de Senarmont, E. Verdet, and L. Fresnel), Oeuvres complètes d'Augustin Fresnel, Paris: Imprimerie Impériale (3 vols., 1866–70), vol.1 (1866).
 E. Hecht, 1987, Optics, 2nd Ed., Addison Wesley, .
 E. Hecht, 2002, Optics, 4th Ed., Addison Wesley, .
 F.A. Jenkins and H.E. White, 1976, Fundamentals of Optics, 4th Ed., New York: McGraw-Hill, .
 H. Lloyd, 1834, "Report on the progress and present state of physical optics", Report of the Fourth Meeting of the British Association for the Advancement of Science (held at Edinburgh in 1834), London: J. Murray, 1835, pp.295–413.
 W. Whewell, 1857, History of the Inductive Sciences: From the Earliest to the Present Time, 3rd Ed., London: J.W. Parker & Son, vol.2.
 E. T. Whittaker, 1910, A History of the Theories of Aether and Electricity: From the Age of Descartes to the Close of the Nineteenth Century, London: Longmans, Green, & Co.

Further reading

Encyclopaedia of Physics (2nd Edition), R.G. Lerner, G.L. Trigg, VHC publishers, 1991, ISBN (Verlagsgesellschaft) 3-527-26954-1, ISBN (VHC Inc.) 0-89573-752-3
McGraw Hill Encyclopaedia of Physics (2nd Edition), C.B. Parker, 1994,

External links 
Fresnel Equations – Wolfram.
Fresnel equations calculator
FreeSnell – Free software computes the optical properties of multilayer materials.
Thinfilm – Web interface for calculating optical properties of thin films and multilayer materials (reflection & transmission coefficients, ellipsometric parameters Psi & Delta).
Simple web interface for calculating single-interface reflection and refraction angles and strengths.
Reflection and transmittance for two dielectrics – Mathematica interactive webpage that shows the relations between index of refraction and reflection.
A self-contained first-principles derivation of the transmission and reflection probabilities from a multilayer with complex indices of refraction.

Light
Geometrical optics
Physical optics
Polarization (waves)
Equations of physics
History of physics